The 2009 Northeastern Huskies football team represented Northeastern University in the 2009 NCAA Division I FCS football season. Northeastern competed as a member of the Colonial Athletic Association (CAA) under head football coach Rocky Hager and played their home games at Parsons Field. The 2009 campaign was the final year that Northeastern fielded a football team. The decision to drop the program after this season cited financial problems, poor attendance, and very few winning seasons.

Schedule

References

Northeastern
Northeastern Huskies football seasons
Northeastern Huskies football